Rvati may refer to:

 Rvati (Raška), a village in Serbia
 Rvati (Obrenovac), a village in Serbia
 Arvati, a village in North Macedonia